Zaplyusye is the name of several inhabited localities in Pskov Oblast, Russia.

Urban localities
Zaplyusye (urban-type settlement), a work settlement in Plyussky District

Rural localities
Zaplyusye (rural locality), a village in Plyussky District